Orc is the nineteenth studio album by American garage rock band Oh Sees, released on August 25, 2017, on Castle Face Records. It is the band's first studio album to be released under the name Oh Sees, after  it was announced that they would be dropping Thee from their name.

Co-produced by John Dwyer, Eric Bauer, Ty Segall and Enrique Tena, it is the band's first album to feature drummer Paul Quattrone, and is the first album in nine years to not feature recording engineer and regular collaborator Chris Woodhouse.

Critical reception

At Metacritic, which assigns a normalized rating out of 100 to reviews from mainstream critics, Orc received an average score of 79, based on 18 reviews, indicating "generally favorable reviews".

Among the critics providing praise for the album was Tim Sendra of AllMusic, who stated that "Orc is another classic Oh Sees album that shows no signs of wear and tear anyplace in the operation."

Accolades

Track listing

Personnel
Credits adapted from AllMusic.

Oh Sees
John Dwyer – guitar, vocals, Mellotron, synths, flute, recorder, fife, hand percussion, Wurlitzer C3, Wurlitzer Electric Piano, sampling
Tim Hellman – bass
Dan Rincon – drums
Paul Quattrone – drums

Additional musicians
Brigid Dawson – vocals on "Nite Expo", "Keys to the Castle" and "Cadaver Dog"
Joe Cueto – viola, violin on "Keys to the Castle" and "Drowned Beast"

Technical personnel
Robery Beatty – artwork
Eric Bauer – engineering, mixing, production
JJ Golden – mastering
Matthew Jones – layout
Ty Segall – engineering, production
Enrique Tena – engineering, mixing, production

Charts

References

2016 albums
Oh Sees albums
Albums with cover art by Robert Beatty (artist)